Henryk Janikowski (born 22 November 1954) is a Polish footballer. He played in three matches for the Poland national football team in 1981.

References

External links
 

1954 births
Living people
Polish footballers
Poland international footballers
Place of birth missing (living people)
Association footballers not categorized by position